Sjona is a fjord in Nordland county, Norway. The  fjord begins in the municipality of Rana and flows to the west through Nesna and Lurøy municipalities into the sea. The islands of Handnesøya and Tomma lie at the mouth of the fjord. Norwegian County Road 17 follows the entire coast of the fjord. Villages along the shore of the fjord include Flostrand, Mæla, and Myklebustad.

Media gallery

References

Fjords of Nordland
Rana, Norway
Nesna